Joseph Greenwald may refer to:
 Joseph Greenwald (actor), American actor
 Joseph A. Greenwald, American diplomat

See also
 Joe Greenwald, American equestrian
 Yosef Greenwald, rabbi